2830 Greenwich is a bright Phocaea asteroid from the inner regions of the asteroid belt. It was discovered on 14 April 1980, by American astronomer Edward Bowell at Lowell's U.S. Anderson Mesa Station, Arizona, and named for the historical Royal Greenwich Observatory in England.

Classification and orbit 

Greenwich is a member of the Phocaea family, a group of asteroids with similar orbital characteristics. It orbits the Sun in the inner main-belt at a distance of 1.9–2.9 AU once every 3 years and 8 months (1,340 days). Its orbit has an eccentricity of 0.21 and an inclination of 25° with respect to the ecliptic.

Naming 

This minor planet is named for the Royal Greenwich Observatory, home of the Astronomer Royal and located in the London borough of Greenwich, England. The naming took place on the occasion of the centennial of its adoption as "the Greenwich prime meridian for longitude and time". Founded for naval purposes in 1675, the Royal Observatory quickly became a leading institution in astronomy. In 1884, the prime meridian finally became a worldwide standard. The official naming citation was published by the Minor Planet Center on 15 May 1984.

Physical characteristics 

In the Tholen taxonomy, Greenwich is classified as a stony S-type asteroid.

Lightcurves 

In May 2002, a photometric lightcurve analysis by French amateur astronomer Christophe Demeautis gave an ambiguous rotation period of 24 hours with a brightness variation of 0.5 in magnitude.

Diameter and albedo 

According to the surveys carried out by NASA's Wide-field Infrared Survey Explorer with its subsequent NEOWISE mission, Greenwich measures between 7.9 and 9.5 kilometers in diameter, and its surface has an albedo between 0.17 and 0.19. The Collaborative Asteroid Lightcurve Link adopts Petr Pravec's revised WISE-results, that is, a diameter of 9.252 kilometer with an albedo of 0.1865 and an absolute magnitude of 12.61.

See also 
 14141 Demeautis, 3-kilometer Flora asteroid named after Christophe Demeautis

References

External links 
 Lightcurve Database Query (LCDB), at www.minorplanet.info
 Dictionary of Minor Planet Names, Google books
 Asteroids and comets rotation curves, CdR – Geneva Observatory, Raoul Behrend
 Discovery Circumstances: Numbered Minor Planets (1)-(5000) – Minor Planet Center
 
 

002830
Discoveries by Edward L. G. Bowell
Named minor planets
002830
19800414